Odry is a town in Nový Jičín District in the Moravian-Silesian Region of the Czech Republic. It has about 7,300 inhabitants. The historic town centre is well preserved and is protected by law as an urban monument zone.

Administrative parts
Villages of Dobešov, Kamenka, Klokočůvek, Loučky, Pohoř, Tošovice, Veselí and Vítovka are administrative parts of Odry. Kamenka and Klokočůvek form an exclave of the municipal territory.

Etymology
The name of Odry is derived from the river Oder.

Geography

Odry is located in the Nízký Jeseník mountain range in the valley of the Oder River. A set of fish ponds is situated in the southern part of the municipal territory.

History
A predecessor of Odry was a settlement known as Vyhnanov. The first written mention of Vyhnanov is from 1234. In the second half of the 13th century, a new fortified town was established on the site of Vyhnanov. In the 14th century, Odry became a local economic centre. During the Hussite Wars, Odry served as a military base of the Hussites. In 1481, the town became a part of the Duchy of Troppau and Silesia.

In the 18th century, lead and silver were mined in Odry and surrounding area. In 1774, a woolen goods factory was established here, and in the mid-19th century, drapery industry developed. In 1866, the first rubber factory in the country started operating here.

Sights

The historic centre is formed by the Masarykovo Square and surroundings. The square is lined with Renaissance burgher houses and in the middle are the statue of the Assumption of the Virgin Mary from 1785 and a Neoclassical fountain from 1897. Remains of the town fortifications from the 15th century with a semi-circular bastion are preserved to this day.

The most important monument is the Church of Saint Bartholomew. The originally Gothic church was baroque rebuilt in 1691–1692. The bell in the church tower dates from 1374 and is the oldest bell in Moravia. Notable is also the rectory, which was rebuilt into its current form in 1700.

Notable people
Leopold Münster (1920–1944), German Luftwaffe pilot
Ferdinand Ulrich (1931–2020), German philosopher

Twin towns – sister cities

Odry is twinned with:
 Kuźnia Raciborska, Poland
 Niefern-Öschelbronn, Germany

References

External links

Cities and towns in the Czech Republic
Populated places in Nový Jičín District
Lichnowsky